John Van Nostrand (July 17, 1961 – April 15, 1984) was a professional tennis player from the United States. His sister Molly Van Nostrand also played tennis professionally.

Career
Van Nostrand was a dual NCAA All-American for Pepperdine University, in 1982 and 1983.

He appeared in the main draw of one Grand Slam during his career, the 1983 Australian Open, in the men's doubles, but never got to play a point, as he and partner Jim Gurfein defaulted the match.

The American was a quarter-finalist at the 1983 Hall of Fame Tennis Championships, held in Newport, Rhode Island. He beat world number 46 Mike De Palmer in the opening round and Mike Leach in the second round.

In the first tournament of the 1984 Grand Prix season, at Auckland, Van Nostrand and partner Brian Levine were doubles champions. The pair upset top seeds Broderick Dyke and Rod Frawley in the quarter-finals.

Three months later, Van Nostrand was killed in a car accident, along with fellow player Joe Heldman. They had been traveling from Mexico City to the San Luis Potosí Challenger tournament. On a mountainous road near San Juan del Río, their car went off a curve and fell 660 feet down the mountain.

Grand Prix career finals

Doubles: 1 (1–0)

Challenger titles

Doubles: (1)

References

External links 
 
 

1961 births
1984 deaths
American male tennis players
Tennis people from New York (state)
Pepperdine Waves men's tennis players
Road incident deaths in Mexico
People from Long Island
Sportspeople from New York City